"Lay Down Beside Me" is a song written by American country music artist Don Williams. It was first recorded by Kenny Rogers on his 1977 self-titled album.

Williams later released his own version which was released as the second single from his 1979 album, Expressions. The single reached No. 3 on the Billboard Hot Country Singles & Tracks chart in 1979.

Charts

Weekly charts

Year-end charts

References

1979 singles
1977 songs
Kenny Rogers songs
Don Williams songs
Song recordings produced by Garth Fundis
Songs written by Don Williams
MCA Records singles